Causewayhead railway station served the suburb of Causewayhead in Stirling, Scotland, from 1852 to 1955 on the Stirling and Dunfermline Railway.

History 
The station opened on 1 July 1852 by the North British Railway. The goods yard was to the north west and the signal box, which opened in 1900, was on the westbound platform. The station closed on 1 January 1917 but reopened on 1 February 1919, only to close again on 4 July 1955.
There is a proposal in consideration to reopen the station at a nearby site.

References

External links 

Disused railway stations in Stirlingshire
Railway stations in Great Britain opened in 1852
Railway stations in Great Britain closed in 1917
Railway stations in Great Britain opened in 1919
Railway stations in Great Britain closed in 1955
Former North British Railway stations
1852 establishments in Scotland
1955 disestablishments in Scotland